Trimeresurus yingjiangensis, also known as Yingjiang green pitviper, is a species of pit viper. It is endemic to Yunnan in southwest China. It is named after its type locality, Yingjiang County.

References 

yingjiangensis
Snakes of China
Endemic fauna of Yunnan
Reptiles described in 2019